Vyaznikovsky Uyezd (Вязниковский уезд ) was one of the subdivisions of the Vladimir Governorate of the Russian Empire. It was situated in the northeastern part of the governorate. Its administrative centre was Vyazniki.

Demographics
At the time of the Russian Empire Census of 1897, Vyaznikovsky Uyezd had a population of 86,352. Of these, 99.9% spoke Russian as their native language.

References

 
Uezds of Vladimir Governorate
Vladimir Governorate